"Keep My Spirit Alive" is a song by American rapper Kanye West from his tenth studio album, Donda (2021). The song features vocals from fellow American rappers Conway the Machine and Westside Gunn and originally featured additional vocals from  KayCyy.

Background and recording
Conway the Machine, Westside Gunn and Benny the Butcher toured as Griselda in USA in early 2020. The day after the tour finished, Griselda went to West's Sunday Service and were invited to go Wyoming and record with West. On March 12, 2020, Westside Gunn and Conway the Machine were spotted in Wyoming recording for West's album. Westside Gunn would later confirm the collaboration in an interview with Elliot Wilson on Tidal. Conway the Machine confirmed in an August 2020 interview that he had songwriting credits on Donda, as well as a record with Westside Gunn and West. Though Westside Gunn went to Wyoming in early 2020, his verse on "Keep My Spirit Alive" was not recorded until the end of the recording sessions for his album Who Made the Sunshine. Westside Gunn said the following in an interview with Complex about the collaboration:

Release and promotion
The song was officially first previewed during a private listening party for Donda in Las Vegas on July 19, 2021. The song was absent from the album's first public listening party on July 22, 2021, which took place at the Mercedes-Benz Stadium in Atlanta, Georgia. The subsequent second listening party at the same stadium on August 5, 2021, featured the song. An alternate version of the song played at the third and final public listening party in Soldier Field, Chicago, Illinois on August 26, 2021; this alternate version featured West singing the chorus instead of the album version's KayCyy chorus. The song that originally released on August 29 had KayCyy singing the chorus.

On September 28, 2021, a new version of "Keep My Spirit Alive" was uploaded onto streaming platforms that replaced the original version where West performed the chorus instead of KayCyy. The version with KayCyy on the chorus was later included in the deluxe track listing for Donda, released November 14, 2021, and was renamed "Keep My Spirit Alive pt 2" to differentiate it from the version with West on the chorus.

Personnel
 Master and mix engineering – Maurizio "Irko" Sera
 Record engineering – Alejandro Rodriguez-Dawsøn, Josh Berg, Kalam Ali Muttalib, Mikalai Skrobat and Rashade Benani Bevel
 Vocal editing – Louis Bell and Patrick Hundley
 Drums – Darius Woodley and Rico Nichols
 Vocals – Westside Gunn and Conway the Machine
 Additional vocals – KayCyy

Charts

Weekly charts

Year-end charts

References

2021 songs
Kanye West songs
Songs written by Kanye West
Song recordings produced by Kanye West